Andrew F. Laine is an American biomedical engineer, currently the Percy K. and Vida L. W. Hudson Professor at Columbia University and is an Institute of Electrical and Electronics Engineers Fellow.

References

Year of birth missing (living people)
Living people
Columbia University faculty
21st-century American engineers
Fellow Members of the IEEE
American biomedical engineers